Andy Goldstein is a British television presenter and radio broadcaster currently working for clyde 1 SSB and Talksport.
He has presented Soccer AM on Saturday mornings, replacing Tim Lovejoy (having also previously taken over from him as co-host on Soccer AM's All Sports Show) in 2004. The All-Sports show ended in 2007. Goldstein is also a former presenter of Eurosports Home Nations Snooker tournaments. He previously presented Sky Sports coverage of Premier League Snooker, 9-Ball Pool (including the Mosconi Cup) and 10 pin bowling Weber Cup. 

As well as presenting, Goldstein has tried his hand at acting too. He appeared as the main character in a series of adverts for TalkTalk shown before Big Brother 5 in 2004.

Goldstein currently hosts Drive, a radio show which runs on talkSPORT from Monday to Friday, along with The Sports Bar 10pm to 1am every Monday night. The show initially broadcast on Sunday nights before being broadcast Monday to Thursday. Following George Galloway's departure from the station, it was increased to 4 nights per week. 

In 2006 , Goldstein presented UKTV G2's coverage of the 2006 FIFA World Cup in Germany.

Goldstein took part in Andy Jacobs world record electric scooter land speed record as a pacemaker up to 78.4 mph then let Jacobs airflow to over 130 mph. At the time they were described as the Cool Runnings of the radio world as it was broadcast live.

Goldstein erroneously reported that talkSPORT DJ and former Chelsea defender Jason Cundy had died after he failed to turn up to present his weekend show in October 2008. This led to some Chelsea fans laying flowers at Stamford Bridge and sending in condolences to the radio station. Goldstein later said he was only joking. On 3 August, Goldstein accused a Twitter account belonging to Rio Ferdinand as being fake. Shortly after, Rio Ferdinand rang the show to prove himself, hence forcing Goldstein to apologise. In August 2016, Goldstein mistakenly contacted a parody Twitter account of footballer Carlton Cole in an attempt to organise an interview with Cole himself. The account of Cole responded to his messages by quoting the lyrics to The Killers song Mr Brightside. He was also a childhood friend of Snooker player Ronnie O'Sullivan and the pair worked together as presenter and pundit on Eurosport's snooker tournaments. He also worked on Manchester United TV and is a Manchester United supporter. 

Goldstein was also part of a viral talkSPORT video, involving the Danish wrestling family, the Herrings including Hannah and Schmeltz. He has had numerous engagements and tiffs with Klobby, Khalid and 100% Mo.

Other appearances
Jungle Drums (I'm a Celebrity, Get Me Out of Here! daytime show on ITV2)
Fash's Football Challenge (alongside Caroline Flack on Bravo)
UKTV's 2006 FIFA World Cup coverage.
Fighting Talk (BBC Radio) on 24 January 2007 (finishing last with 31 points) and 14 April 2007 (joint third/last with 42 points)
Can't Sing Singers (BBC1)
Street-Cred Sudoku (Dave)
Win Your Own Home (UK Style)
Totally Top Trumps (Challenge TV)
Strangest Ever (Five)
My Greatest Ever Singles Party (Five)
Swag (Five)
The Unofficial World Records of Sex (Sky One)
FHM High Street Honeys (Sky One)
Bikini Heaven (Sky One)
Six Degrees (Sky One)
Resistance (BBC Three)
The Contenders (BBC Education)
You're On Sky Sports (Sky Sports 1)
TalkSports sports bar
played for Roding Wanderers
TalkSports Daily Drive time Host

See also
UKTV Car of the Year 2007

References

British association football commentators
British sports broadcasters
British television presenters
British people of Jewish descent
Living people
Soccer AM
Year of birth missing (living people)